Hvardiiske is name of several populated places in Ukraine:

Towns (urban settlements)
 Hvardiiske, Novomoskovsk Raion
 Hvardiiske, Simferopol Raion

Villages
 Hvardiiske, Terebovlia Raion

Airbase
 Gvardeyskoye (air base), airbase in Crimea

See also
 Gvardeysky (disambiguation)